Ron Peters may refer to:

Ron Peters (New Zealand politician), brother of politicians
Ron Peters, member of the Oklahoma House of Representatives